Bob Osim, also written as Bob Usim, (born 15 July 1980, in Lagos, Nigeria) was a Nigerian international footballer. He currently coaches for Calabar Rovers in the second level Nigeria National League.

Career
Osim missed the 2007 season with Heartland because of nagging injuries before being signed to the resurrected Rovers for the 2008/09 season, the team he began his career with.

Attributes
Bob Osim's main position was defensive midfield but he would also play left back and right back.

External links

Usim Named in Nigeria squad -BBC Article
Rovers will bounce back, says Osim (Guardian, 1 Sept. 2008)

1980 births
Living people
Nigerian footballers
Nigeria international footballers
Enyimba F.C. players
Heartland F.C. players
Rangers International F.C. players
Calabar Rovers F.C. players
Sunshine Stars F.C. players
Association football defenders